Thomas Llewelyn Jones (11 October 1915 – 9 January 2009) was a Welsh language author. Over a writing career of more than 50 years, he became one of the most prolific and popular authors of children's books in Welsh. He wrote, and was generally known, as T. Llew Jones.

Biography 
T. Llew Jones was born at 1 Bwlch Melyn, Pentrecwrt, Llandysul. Educated at Ysgol Gynradd Capel Graig and Llandysul Grammar School, he was a primary school teacher in various schools in Ceredigion for 35 years before becoming a full-time writer, first at Tregroes Primary School and then at Ysgol Coedybryn near Llandysul where he became headmaster. He first came to prominence as a poet, winning the chair at the National Eisteddfod in 1958 and then again in 1959.

He continued to write poetry, for children often, but was best known as a writer of adventure and detective novels for children. Many of these are historical novels based on the exploits of people such as Bartholomew Roberts and Twm Sion Cati. He published well over 50 books in total, including books for adults as well as children. Some of these are non-fiction titles, for example Ofnadwy Nos is an account of the wrecking of the Royal Charter. Some of his books have been translated into English and a number have been adapted for television.

He was awarded an honorary MA degree by the University of Wales in 1977, and in 1991 he was awarded the Mary Vaughan Jones Award, given for outstanding contributions to children's literature in Wales. In March 2005, aged nearly 90, he won the chair in Cymdeithas Ceredigion's annual Eisteddfod.

Jones died aged 93 on 9 January 2009.

A new Welsh-medium primary school, Ysgol Gynradd Gymunedol T Llew Jones, in Brynhoffnant near Llangrannog, was named in his honour in 2012.  It was built to replace four small primary schools in the villages of Blaenporth, Glynarthen, Rhydlewis and Pontgarreg.

He was the father of the political activist, Emyr Llewelyn, international chess player, Iolo Ceredig Jones and Eira Prosser.

Chess 
Jones was also a keen chess player, he wrote the only Welsh language chess manual together with his son, Iolo. He was one of the small group of Welsh Chess Union members and officials who instigated and fought for the secession of the WCU from the British Chess Federation (as it then was) in 1970 and its successful application to join the World Chess Federation (FIDE) as an independent member.  As well as holding several posts in the WCU, Jones founded and edited Y Ddraig which grew from the Dyfed Chess Association newsletter into the magazine of Welsh chess in the 1970s. He managed the Men's 1974 Olympiad team in Nice which achieved Wales best-ever result and also the Women's team in the 1976 Olympiad in Israel.  He was for many years Vice-President of the WCU.

Jones was heavily involved in Dyfed chess from the 1960s onwards, in founding and running the Dyfed Chess Association, its league, Cardigan Chess Club and the highly successful Dyfed Open Congress. At his death he was Life President of the Dyfed Chess Association.  Over the board he was a keen and competitive player, but achieved his best results at postal chess, representing Welsh international teams with distinction.

Awards and honours
1958 – Chair, Welsh National Eisteddfod, Ebbw Vale
1959 – Chair, Welsh National Eisteddfod, Caernarfon
1967 – Tir na n-Og Award for Tân ar y Comin
1990 – Tir na n-Og Award for Lleuad yn Olau
1991 – Mary Vaughan Jones Award
2007 – Welsh Publishing Awards, "Best Seller – Poetry", for Geiriau a Gerais

Bibliography

Books by T. Llew Jones
{| class="wikitable" border=1
!Title
!Notes
!First published
!Other editions
|- align="left"
|* Trysor Plas y wernen || || 1958 || 1991, Gwasg Christopher Davies &November 2005, Gwasg Gomer
|-
|* Merched y môr a chwedlau eraill || || 1958, Gwasg Gee, Aberystwyth|| 
|-
|* Trysor y Môr-Ladron || || 1960, Llyfrau'r Dryw || January 1989, Gwasg Gomer
|-
|* Y Merlyn Du || || 1960, Gwasg Aberystwyth || January 1995, Gwasg Gomer
|-
|* Anturiaethau Twm Siôn Cati:Y Ffordd Beryglus || || April 1963, CLC || March 1994 & July 2000,Gwasg Gomer
|-
|* Anturiaethau Twm Siôn Cati:Ymysg Lladron || || November 1965, Cymdeithas Lyfrau Ceredigion|CLC || February 1999, Gwasg Gomer 
|-
|* Swn Y Malu || || 1967, Gwasg Gomer ||
|-
|* Anturiaethau Twm Siôn Cati:Dial o'r Diwedd || || 1968, Cymdeithas Lyfrau Ceredigion|CLC || June 1968, Cymdeithas Lyfrau Ceredigion|CLC, November 1998 &January 2004, Gwasg Gomer
|-
|* Yr Ergyd Farwol || || 1969, Gwasg Gomer || 
|-
|* Ofnadwy Nos || Factual book || 1971 || 31 December 1991 & January 1995,Gwasg Gomer  
|-
|* Barti Ddu o Gasnewy' Bach || || 1973 || Under the title Barti Ddu:November 1995, Gwasg Christopher Davies & February 2004, Gwasg Gomer
|-
|* Un Noson Dywyll || || 1973 || January 2003 & February 2008,Gwasg Gomer
|-
|* Cyfrinach y Lludw || || January 1975 || January 1994, Gwasg Gomer
|-
|* Tân ar y Comin || Tir na n-Og Award winner || June 1975 || December 1993, June 2003, Gwasg Gomer
|-
|* Arswyd y byd! || || December 1975, Gwasg Gomer || 
|-
|* Rwy'i Am Fod Yn Ddoctor || || 1976, JD Lewis
|-
|* Ysbryd Plas Nantesgob || || 1976|| 
|-
|* Cerddi Pentalar || || August 1976, Gwasg Gomer
|-
|* Lawr ar Lan y Môr || || April 1977, JD Lewis || 
|-
|* Dirgelwch yr Ogof || || August 1977, Gwasg Gomer || November 2002, Gwasg Gomer
|-
|* Dysgu Difyr || || November 1977, JD Lewis || 
|-
|* Cerddi || || 1979, JD Lewis
|-
|* Slawer Dydd || || December 1979, Gwasg Gomer
|-
|* A Chwaraei di Wyddbwyll?|| with his son, Iolo Ceredig Jones || 31 December 1980, Gwasg Gomer || 
|-
|* Dewi Emrys || || 1981, Cyhoeddiadau Barddas ||
|-
|* Cyfoeth Awen Isfoel || || June 1981, Gwasg Gomer ||
|-
|* Ynys y Trysor || || 1986, Gwasg Mynydd Mawr ||
|-
|* Rownd Y Byd mewn 80 diwrnod ||Translation of Round The World in 80 Days by Jules Verne || 1986, Gwasg Gomer ||
|-
|* Storm || || 1987, Gwasg Gomer || 
|-
|* Popeth am Ysbrydion || || 1987, Gwasg Gomer ||
|-
|* Canu'n iach! || || 1987 || October 1988, Gwasg Gomer
|-
|* Cri'r Dylluan || || 31 December 1988, Gwasg Gomer || March 2005, Gwasg Gomer
|-
|* Gwaed ar eu Dwylo || || 31 December 1988, Gwasg Gomer || 
|-
|* Berw gwyllt yn Abergwaun:Hanes rhyfedd glaniad yFfrancod yn Abergwaun yn 1797 || || 1986, Gwasg Carreg Gwalch || 
|-
|* Corff ar y Traeth || ||1988 || February 1989, Gwasg Gomer
|-
|* Lleuad yn Olau || Tir na n-Og Award winner || 20 April 1989, Gwasg Gomer || June 1999, Gwasg Gomer
|-
|* One Moonlit Night || Translation of Lleuad yn OlauGillian Clarke || || September 1991, Gwasg Gomer
|-
|* Penillion y Plant || Illustrated by Jac Jones || January 1990, Gwasg Gomer || March 1992, Gwasg Gomer
|-
|* Cyfrinach Wncwl Daniel:Hanes Rhyfedd HenFeddyginiaeth Lysieuol || with Dafydd Wyn Jones || January 1992, Gwasg Gomer ||
|-
|* Cancer Curers – Or Quacks?:The Story of a SecretHerbal Remedy || with Dafydd Wyn JonesTranslation of Cyfrinach Wncwl Daniel,by Dafydd Wyn Jones || January 1993, Gwasg Gomer ||
|-
|* Corn, pistol a chwip || || 31 December 1992, Gwasg Gomer || 
|-
|*Cân y Morfilod || Translation of a book by Dyan Sheldon || 1993, Cymdeithas Lyfrau Ceredigion|CLC ||
|-
|* Santa || || November 1993, Cymdeithas Lyfrau Ceredigion|CLC ||
|-
|* Gipsy Fires || Translation of his novel Tân ar y Comin,with Carol Byrne Jones || January 1994, Pont Books
|-
|* Y Gelyn ar y Trên || || January 1994 || June 2004, Gwasg Gomer 
|-
|* Jona Ym Mol y Morfil || || January 1994, Gwasg Cambria ||
|-
|* Llyfrau Darllen Newydd: Llyfr 1 || || 1994 || June 2000, Gwasg Gomer
|-
|* Llyfrau Darllen Newydd: Llyfr 2 || || 1996 || January 1996, Gwasg Gomer
|-
|* Hen Gof : Ysgrifau llên gwerin || || 1996|| 
|-
|* Trysorau T. Llew: Modrwy Aur yBwda a Storïau Eraill || Collection, illustrated by Jac Jones || Wedi eu cyhoeddi eisioes || November 1997, Gwasg Gomer
|-
|* Trysorau T. Llew: Y Môr yn eu Gwaed || Siân Lewis's selection fromT. Llew Jones' exciting novels || November 1997, Gwasg Gomer || 
|-
|* Llyfrau Darllen Newydd: Llyfr 3 || || 1997 || July 2000, Gwasg Gomer
|-
|* Llyfrau Darllen Newydd: Llyfr 4 || || November 1998, Gwasg Gomer ||
|-
|* Lladron Defaid || Welsh adaptation of The Wild Morgansby Alison Morgan || May 2001, Gwasg Gomer || 
|-
|* Storïau Cwm-pen-llo || Collection of 4 stories || Appeared inPethe Plant in 1976 || 1 November 2001,Gwasg Carreg Gwalch 
|-
|* Fy Mhobol I || Autobiography || August 2002, Gwasg Gomer || March 2003, Gwasg Gomer 
|-
|* Trysorfa T. Llew Jones || ed. Tudur Dylan Jones, illustrated by Jac Jones ||  November 2004, Gwasg Gomer ||
|-
|* Bocs Anrheg || || October 2005, Gwasg Gomer || 
|-
|* Geiriau a Gerais || || November 2006, Gwasg Gomer || 
|-
|* Cerddi newydd i blant (o bob oed) || || ||
|-
|* Gormod o Raff || || || 
|-
|* Helicopter! help! : a storiau eraill || || || 
|}

CDsLleuad yn Olau – Chwedlau Traddodiadol o Gymru, November 2003, re-printed February 2005 (Tympan)

Books edited by T. Llew JonesCerddi Gwlad Ac Ysgol, October 1976, Gwasg GomerTales the Wind Told, August 1979, JD LewisCerddi Bardd y Werin – Detholiad o Farddoniaeth Crwys, January 1994, Gwasg Gomer

Books about T. Llew Jones
Teifi, Siân Cyfaredd y cyfarwydd : astudiaeth o fywyd a gwaith y prifardd T. Llew JonesCyfrol deyrnged y Prifardd T. Llew Jones'' (edited by Gwynn ap Gwilym)

References

External links
(Welsh) Cronfa Goffa T Llew Jones, T Llew Jones Memorial Fund.
Interview from BBC News on 11 October 2005
(Welsh) "Adnabod Awdur", brief biography and questionnaire.
Ysgol T Llew Jones Welsh Primary school

1915 births
2009 deaths
Chaired bards
People from Carmarthenshire
Welsh-language poets
Welsh-language writers
Welsh children's writers
Welsh novelists
People educated at Llandysul Grammar School
20th-century Welsh poets
20th-century Welsh novelists

T.Llew Jones is the best